is a 2004 Japanese film directed by Jun Ichikawa, based on the short story by Haruki Murakami.

Inspiration
Haruki Murakami was intrigued by the name Tony Takitani when, at a garage sale on Maui, he found a yellow T-shirt that said, "Tony Takitani, House (D)."
  
At the time, Takitani was running for office. Murakami decided to write the man's life story as this short story.

Plot summary
The film starts by telling the story of Tony's father Takitani Shozaburo, a jazz trombonist from Japan, who spends the Second World War in China. Shozaburo is imprisoned and many of his fellow inmates are executed. He expects he will be executed, and he is shown curled up on the floor of his cell. However, he survives and in 1946 returns to Japan where he marries a distant relative on his mother's side. A year later they have a child, Tony, but Tony's mother dies three days after giving birth to him.

Shozaburo continues to travel and is away from home most of the time. Because of his Americanised name people often react oddly or sometimes with hostility to Tony. "Spending time alone was the most natural thing in the world for Tony." He develops an interest in drawing but prefers accuracy over emotion. As an adult he gets a job as a technical illustrator.

Tony falls in love with a young client, Eiko, who is obsessed with shopping for clothes and accessories. On their fifth date he proposes to her, but she says she has been seeing someone else for some time. She says she will think it over. Eventually Eiko accepts, and they are married.

Although Eiko and Tony are very happy they recognise that her shopping is becoming a problem: Eiko accumulates so many clothes and shoes that they are given an entire room in the house. One day she decides to drive to her favourite boutique to return a coat and dress. After she has returned the clothes initially Eiko feels a sense of release but, whilst waiting at traffic lights, she begins to think about their colour, style, and texture. The lights change and, possibly because she is distracted, there is a crash in which Eiko is killed.

Tony is completely distraught and sets about hiring an assistant, Hisako, with the one condition that she should wear his wife's clothes to work in "as a uniform." When she sees Eiko's clothes Hisako begins to cry. Tony decides not to hire an assistant and sells the clothes instead.

Two years after his wife's death Tony's father dies, leaving his trombone and a collection of jazz records. Tony keeps the trombone and the records in the room where Eiko used to keep her clothes. After a year Tony sells the records and the trombone.

One evening at what might be the opening of an art exhibition a young man approaches Tony and introduces himself as the other man Eiko was seeing before she married Tony. He speaks disparagingly of Eiko. Tony challenges him and leaves.

The next scene shows Tony in the empty room and recreates, and then cuts to, the earlier scene of Tony's father in the prison cell in China. He thinks about Hisako. In the final scene Tony calls Hisako but puts the phone down before she can answer.

Cast
Issey Ogata – Tony Takitani, Shozaburo Takitani
Rie Miyazawa – Konuma Eiko, Hisako
Takahumi Shinohara – Young Tony Takitani
Hidetoshi Nishijima – Narrator (voice)

Soundtrack

The soundtrack for the film was entirely composed by Ryuichi Sakamoto.

Track listing
 "DNA - Intro" 11:37
 "Solitude" 4:55
 "DNA"	6:28
 "Bottom" 0:40
 "Fotografia #1" 3:33
 "Fotografia #2" 3:42
 "Solitude #2" 2:34
 "Harmonics #1" 0:51
 "Solitude - One Note" 3:25
 "Harmonics #2" 1:02
 "Solitude - Theme" 4:00

Reception
The New York Times calls it "A delicate wisp of a film with a surprisingly sharp sting".

References

External links
Official site (archived)

Tony Takitani at JMDb (in Japanese)
Special edition book of the short story, Tony Takitani by Haruki Murakami
Region 2 DVD review
Web edition of the short story, Tony Takitani by Haruki Murakami

2004 films
2004 drama films
Japanese drama films
Films based on short fiction
Films based on works by Haruki Murakami
Films directed by Jun Ichikawa
Films scored by Ryuichi Sakamoto